The 2021 Campeonato Paraibano de Futebol was the 111th edition of Paraíba's top professional football league. The competition was originally scheduled to begin on 17 March and end on 26 May, but the start was first postponed to 31 March due to clashes with other competitions, and then further postponed to 14 April due to the state government enforcing closure of stadiums in an attempt to halt the spread of COVID-19. The end date was eventually fixed for 20 June, as the final had to be scheduled around other competitions.

Treze were defending champions, after winning the 2020 final against Campinense.

Format
The competition format differed from recent seasons, due to the CBF releasing fewer dates for the competition, because of the late running of the 2020 season. The competition was divided into a number of stages. No teams were promoted to the competition, as the second division did not take place in 2020. Therefore the competition ran with just eight teams.

In the first phase, the eight teams played each other once. The top two clubs in the resulting table qualified directly for the semi-finals, whilst the clubs placed third to sixth qualified for the second stage.

In the second phase, the third placed club in the first phase played the sixth placed club, and the fourth placed club played the fifth placed club, in a single match, with the highest placed club having home advantage. The winners of the two matches qualified for the semi-finals.

In the semi-final, the first placed club in the first phase played against the winner of the fourth placed v fifth placed game in the second phase. The second placed club in the first phase played against the winner of the third placed v sixth placed game in the second round.  

The winner of the two semi-finals played in a two-legged final.

Qualification
The two finalists qualified to participate in the 2022 Copa do Brasil and 2022 Copa do Nordeste. The two best placed teams (other than those already participating in a national league) qualified to participate in the 2022 Campeonato Brasileiro Série D.

Participating teams

First phase

Second phase
In the second phase, the four qualifiers from the first phase played a single game, based on their finishing position in the first phase.

Semi-finals
In the semi-final stage, the direct qualifiers from the first phase played a single game against the qualifiers from the second phase

Final
The final took place over two legs, home and away, and the team with the best record in the competition had home advantage in the second leg.

Campinense win 1–0 on aggregate and are 2021 Campeonato Paraibano champions.

References

Paraíba
2021